Rivers and Roads may refer to:

 "Rivers and Roads", a song by the American folk band The Head and the Heart
 Rivers and Roads (2018), an album by the acoustic bluegrass group The Special Consensus